Rachel "Rae" Claire Cooper  is an Australian professor, researcher and women's employment specialist.

Cooper is professor of gender, work and employment relations at the University of Sydney Business School.  She is co-director of the university's Women, Work & Leadership Research Group. She has previously held a number of leadership roles within the higher education sector.

Cooper researches many aspects of women's working lives including women's work in male-dominated occupations, women's pay, workplace regulation and good quality flexible jobs. She has supervised many PhDs across these areas.

Other noteworthy positions Cooper has held throughout her career include editor of Journal of Industrial Relations, president of the Association of Industrial Relations Academics of Australia and New Zealand, executive member of the International Labor and Employment Relations Association, director of Family Planning NSW, chair of board of directors at Australian Hearing, deputy chair of the New South Wales Premier's Expert Advisory Council of Women, director of New South Wales TAFE Commission, director of New South Wales Rural Assistance Authority and chairperson of the New South Wales Working Women's Centre.

Cooper is a regular contributor to discussions in the Australian media about gender equality.

For her service to higher education and workplace policy and practice, Cooper was appointed as an Officer of the Order of Australia in the 2019 Queen's Birthday Honours.

Rae has two children.

Publications 

All publications and grants are available at https://sydney.edu.au/business/about/our-people/academic-staff/rae-cooper.html#

References

External links 
Rae Cooper on Google Scholar

Year of birth missing (living people)
Living people
Officers of the Order of Australia
Academic staff of the University of Sydney
Gender studies academics